Liewe Heksie (Beloved Little Witch) is an Afrikaans work of fiction developed by children's book author Verna Vels in 1961.  It tells the stories of Liewe Heksie who stays with elves in Blommeland. There saga started off as radio stories followed by books and stories on vinyl record. It then debuted on television in 1978 as an Afrikaans language children's television programme directed by Louise Smit.  The second series of Liewe Heksie began in 1981 for a total od 52 episodes.

Stories

Series 1

Liewe Heksie en die Silwerroos (Liewe Heksie and the Silver Rose)
Liewe Heksie se Sterretjieskombuis (Liewe Heksie's Star-filled Kitchen)
Liewe Heksie en die Koekoekie (Liewe Heksie and the Cuckoo-clock)
Liewe Heksie en die Tent (Liewe Heksie and the Tent)
Hoe Mattewis by Heksie kom Woon het (How Mattewis came to live with Heksie)
Liewe Heksie en die Alpeviooltjies (Liewe Heksie and the Cyclamens)
Liewe Heksie en die Forelle (Liewe Heksie and the Trout)
Hoe Liewe Heksie Koning Rosekrans gesond gemaak het (How Liewe Heksie helped the King get better)
Liewe Heksie en die Helikopter (Liewe Heksie and the Helicopter)
Liewe Heksie op die Maan (Liewe Heksie on the Moon)
Liewe Heksie en die Sangeres (Liewe Heksie and the Singer)
Liewe Heksie die Babawagter (Liewe Heksie the Babysitter)
Liewe Heksie en die Diewe (Liewe Heksie and the Thieves)
Mattewis op die Windpomp (Mattewis on the Windmill)
Liewe Heksie in Gifappeltjieland 
Liewe Heksie en die Klompe (Liewe Heksie and the Clogs)
Liewe Heksie en die Donkie (Liewe Heksie and the Donkey)
Liewe Heksie en die Sirkus (Liewe Heksie and the Circus)
Liewe Heksie gaan Skool toe (Liewe Heksie goes to School)
Liewe Heksie en die Motor (Liewe Heksie and the Car)
Liewe Heksie en die Klip met Voete (Liewe Heksie and the Rock with Feet)
Liewe Heksie kry 'n Verjaarsdag (Liewe Heksie has a Birthday)
Liewe Heksie en die Slee (Liewe Heksie and the Sleigh)
Liewe Heksie en die Toorwoorde (Liewe Heksie and the Magic Words)
Inbrekers in Blommeland (Burglars in Blommeland)
Liewe Heksie hou Partytjie (Liewe Heksie throws a Party)

Series 2

Liewe Heksie en die Orkes (Liewe Heksie and the Orchestra)
Liewe Heksie en die Beer (Liewe Heksie and the Bear)
Liewe Heksie en die Pampoene (Liewe Heksie and the Pumpkins)
Liewe Heksie end die Dolfyn (Liewe Heksie and the Dolphin)
Liewe Heksie die Aktrise (Liewe Heksie the Actress)
Liewe Heksie en die Verrassing (Liewe Heksie and the Surprise)
Liewe Heksie Leer Bestuur (Liewe Heksie Learns to Drive)
Liewe Heksie op die Strand (Liewe Heksie on the Beach)
Piekniek in Blommeland (Picnic in Blommeland)
Liewe Heksie en die Krisis (Liewe Heksie and the Crisis)
Liewe Heksie in die Sop (Liewe Heksie in Trouble)
Liewe Heksie maak 'n Plan (Liewe Heksie makes a Plan)
Liewe Heksie se Strykdag (Liewe Heksie's Ironing Day)
Liewe Heksie vertel 'n Storie (Liewe Heksie tells a Story)
Liewe Heksie en die Voëlnes (Liewe Heksie and the Bird's Nest)
Liewe Heksie en die Bal (Liewe Heksie and the Ball)
Liewe Heksie hou Wag (Liewe Heksie keeps Watch)
Liewe Heksie hou Modeparade (Liewe Heksie has a Fashion Show)
Liewe Heksie speel Wegkruipertjie (Liewe Heksie plays Hide-and-seek)
Liewe Heksie en die Vis Met Voete (Liewe Heksie and the Fish with Feet)
Liewe Heksie en die Balonne (Liewe Heksie and the Balloons)
Die Voëlverskrikker (The Scarecrow)
Die Wekker (The Alarm-clock)
Liewe Heksie en die Sterretjieskombuis (Liewe Heksie and the Star-filled Kitchen)
Liewe Heksie en die Geel Motor (Liewe Heksie and the Yellow Car)
Liewe Heksie die Heldin (Liewe Heksie the Heroine)

Published books

The first two books were illustrated by Dorothy Hill, the third by Nikki Jones and the last two by Piet Grobler.

Die Groot Liewe Heksie-storieboek, 1983 (The Big Liewe Heksie Storybook)
Lekker Liewe Heksie Stories, 1983 (Nice Liewe Heksie Stories)
Liewe Heksie en die Rugbywedstryd, 1988 (Liewe Heksie and the Rugby Tournament)
Liewe Heksie en die Rekenaar, 1999 (Liewe Heksie and the Computer)
Die Liewe Heksie Omnibus, 2002 (The Liewe Heksie Omnibus)

References

South African children's television series
South African television shows featuring puppetry